

List of Ambassadors

Nadav Cohen (Non-Resident, Yaounde) 2013 - 2016
Daniel Saada (Non-Resident, Jerusalem) 2009 - 2011
Yoram Elron 2000 - 2003
Meir Shamir (diplomat) 1971 - 1973
David Efrati 1968 - 1971
Shimon Avimor 1965 - 1968 
Yerachmiel Ram Yaron (Non-Resident, Brazzaville) 1960 - 1964

References

Gabon
Israel